Wolf 1069 is a red dwarf star located  away from the Solar System in the constellation of Cygnus. It hosts one known exoplanet.

Planetary system 

A planetary companion to Wolf 1069 was discovered in 2023 via radial velocity. It has a minimum mass close to that of Earth and orbits within the habitable zone of its star, with an orbital period of 15 days. This planet does not transit its host star. Observations have ruled out any additional planets greater than one Earth mass with orbital periods of less than 10 days.

As of its discovery, Wolf 1069 b is the sixth-closest known Earth-mass planet within the conservatively-defined habitable zone, after Proxima Centauri b, Gliese 1061 d, Teegarden's Star c, and Gliese 1002 b & c.

Notes

References 

Cygnus (constellation)
M-type main-sequence stars
Planetary systems with one confirmed planet
1069
1253
J20260528+5834224
352617553